HD 80606 and HD 80607 are two stars comprising a binary star system. They are approximately 217 light-years away in the constellation of Ursa Major. Both stars orbit each other at an average distance of 1,200 astronomical units. The binary system is listed as Σ1341 in the Struve Catalogue of Double Stars; however, this designation is not in wide use and the system is usually referred to by the HD designations of its constituent stars. An extrasolar planet has been confirmed to orbit HD 80606 in a highly elliptical orbit.

Planetary system

The variable radial velocity of HD 80606 was first noticed in 1999 from observations with the 10-m Keck 1 telescope at the W. M. Keck Observatory in Hawaii by the G-Dwarf Planet Search, a survey of nearly 1,000 nearby G dwarfs to identify extrasolar planet candidates. The star was then followed up by the Geneva Extrasolar Planet Search team using the ELODIE spectrograph mounted on the 1.93-m telescope at the Haute-Provence Observatory. The discovery of HD 80606 b was announced on April 4, 2001. Its orbit is misaligned with the star's rotation at 53 degrees. Additional studies using the Spitzer Space Telescope in the infrared, and the Very Large Array in the millimeter radio, have shown that the highly eccentric planet 'b' orbiting HD 80606 grazes the parent star at its closest passage to produce difficult-to-detect stellar lobing, severe 'space weather', aurorae and other non-thermal activity.

At the time, its orbit was the most eccentric orbit of any extrasolar planet known. It has an eccentricity of 0.9336, comparable to that of Comet Halley in the Solar System. The eccentricity may be a result of the Kozai mechanism, which would occur if the planet's orbit is significantly inclined to that of the binary stars. This conclusion is reinforced by the detection of the misalignment, an expected result of the Kozai mechanism.

In a simulation of a ten-million-year span, the planet "sweeps clean" most test particles within 1.75 AU of HD 80606. The 8:1 resonance hollows out another Kirkwood gap at 1.9 AU. There cannot be any habitable planets in this system. Also, observation has ruled out planets heavier than 0.7 Jupiter mass with a period of one year or less.

See also
 Gliese 752
 HD 20782
 Iota Horologii

References

Notes

External links
 

Binary stars
Planetary systems with one confirmed planet
080606
Ursa Major (constellation)
G-type main-sequence stars
Planetary transit variables
045982/3
Durchmusterung objects
Multi-star planetary systems